The Australian Financial Complaints Authority or AFCA is an external dispute resolution (EDR) scheme for consumers who are unable to resolve complaints with member financial services organisations. It is operated as a not-for-profit company limited by guarantee and was authorised in 2018 by the then Minister for Revenue and Financial Services, Kelly O'Dwyer, in accordance with the Corporations Act 2001 (Cth).

AFCA replaced the three pre-existing EDR schemes of the Financial Ombudsman Service (FOS), the Credit and Investments Ombudsman (CIO) and Superannuation Complaints Tribunal (SCT).

Membership of AFCA is a requirement under law or license condition of all financial firms and financial service providers.

AFCA is led by the Chief Ombudsman and CEO, presently David Locke.

History 
The Australian Financial Complaints Authority was established on 1 November 2018, replacing the Financial Ombudsman Service (FOS), the Credit and Investments Ombudsman (CIO) and the Superannuation Complaints Tribunal (SCT). The Australian Government announced on 9 May 2017 that AFCA would be established in response to the review of external dispute resolution and complaints arrangements in the financial system.

Operations and processes

Rules 
The Rules of AFCA outline the types of complaints that AFCA can consider, as well as their procedures, remedies and reporting obligations. The rules were approved by the Australian Securities & Investments Commission (ASIC) on 12 September 2018.

Resolution process 
The AFCA only considers a complaint after the consumer has first attempted to resolve the dispute directly with their financial service provider. If the dispute is unable to be resolved or the outcome is unsatisfactory, AFCA can then consider it.

Complaints can be filed with AFCA through an online form on their website. An AFCA representative will then contact the consumer and relevant financial service provider to settle the dispute. In the case a settlement cannot be reached, an AFCA case analyst will develop a balanced solution. The consumer can then either accept the proposed settlement from AFCA or take their dispute to court.

Governance 
The Australian Financial Complaints Authority is governed by a Board of Directors, which includes equal numbers of industry and consumer representatives. The Independent?? Chair of the Board is Helen Coonan. The Board appoints an independent?? Chief Ombudsman and CEO, presently David Locke.

See also 
 Australian Securities and Investments Commission
 Credit and Investments Ombudsman
 Ombudsmen in Australia
 Superannuation Complaints Tribunal
 Financial Ombudsman Service (Australia)

References

External links 

 Financial Ombudsman Service
 ASIC Money Smart – how to complain

Ombudsmen in Australia
Dispute resolution
Financial regulatory authorities of Australia
Banking Ombudsmen